Jean Delville (19 January 1867 – 19 January 1953) was a Belgian symbolist painter, author, poet, polemicist, teacher, and Theosophist. Delville was the leading exponent of the Belgian Idealist movement in art during the 1890s. He held, throughout his life, the belief that art should be the expression of a higher spiritual truth and that it should be based on the principle of Ideal, or spiritual Beauty. He executed a great number of paintings during his active career from 1887 to the end of the second World War (many now lost or destroyed) expressing his Idealist aesthetic. Delville was trained at the Académie des Beaux-arts in Brussels and proved to be a highly precocious student, winning most of the prestigious competition prizes at the Academy while still a young student. He later won the Belgian Prix de Rome which allowed him to travel to Rome and Florence and study at first hand the works of the artists of the Renaissance.

Characteristically, Delville's paintings are idea-based, expressing philosophical ideals derived from contemporary hermetic and esoteric traditions. At the start of his career, his esoteric perspective was mostly influenced by the work of Eliphas Levi, Edouard Schuré, Joséphin Péladan and Saint-Yves d'Alveydre, and later by the Theosophical writings of Helena Blavatsky and Annie Besant. The main underlying theme of his paintings, especially during his early career, has to do with initiation and the transfiguration of the inner life of the soul towards a higher spiritual purpose. Specifically they deal with themes symbolising Ideal love, death and transfiguration as well as representations of Initiates ('light bringers'), and the relationship between the material and metaphysical dimensions. His paintings and finished drawings are an expression of a highly sensitive visionary imagination articulated through precisely observed forms drawn from nature. He also had a brilliant gift for colour and composition and excelled in the representation of human anatomy. He was an astonishingly skilled draughtsman and painter capable of producing highly expressive works on a grand scale, many of which can be seen in public buildings in Brussels, including the Palais de Justice.

Delville's artistic style is strongly influenced by the Classical tradition. He was a lifelong advocate of the value of the Classical training taught in the Academies. He believed that the discipline acquired as a result of this training was not an end in itself, but rather a valuable means of acquiring a solid drawing and painting technique to allow artists freely to develop their personal artistic style, without inhibiting their individual creative personality. Delville was a respected Academic art teacher. He was employed at the Glasgow School of Art from 1900 to 1906 and as Professor of drawing at the Académie des Beaux-arts in Brussels thereafter until 1937.

He was also a prolific and talented author. He authored more than a dozen books and pamphlets relating to art and esoteric subjects.

He also founded the very successful , which provided affordable art materials for artists at the time.

Early years and training
Delville was born on 19 January 1867 at 2:00 a.m., rue des Dominicains in Louvain. He was born illegitimate into a working class household. Delville never knew his father Joachim Thibault who was a lecturer in Latin and Greek at a local college and who came from a bourgeoisie family. He bore his mother's name until she married a functionary working in Louvain, Victor Delville (1840–1918). Victor adopted Jean who, until then, was known as Jean Libert. The family moved to Brussels in 1870 and settled in Boulevard Waterloo near Porte de Hal.

Delville took an early interest in drawing, even though his initial career ambitions were to become a Doctor. He was introduced to the artist Stiévenart by his adoptive grandfather, François Delville, while still a young boy. Delville recalls that this was 'the first artist I had ever seen, and for me, as a child, still unaware of my vocation, this was an enchanting experience.'

At the age of twelve, Delville entered the famous Athénée Royal in Brussels. His interest in art developed around this time and he received his father's permission to enroll in evening drawing classes at the Académie des Beaux-arts in the rue du Midi in 1879. He entered the course for drawing  (after the classical head) and in 1882 classes for drawing  (after torso and face). Soon after he gave up his schooling at the Athénée to study full-time at the Académie. Portaels objected to Delville's youth, but he excelled in the entrance examination and was unconditionally admitted to study painting under Portaels and Joseph Stallaert. Delville was a precocious talent and at age 17 won many of the major prizes at the Academy including 'drawing after nature', 'painting after nature', 'historical composition' (with high distinction), 'drawing after the antique', and ‘figure painting’.

Artistic career 1887–1900

L'Essor, 1887–1891
Delville first exhibited in a public context at the moderate exhibition society called  from 1887 to 1891. His early works were largely depictions of working-class and peasant life executed in a contemporary realist style influenced by Constant Meunier. Delville's early efforts exhibited in 1887 were largely favourably reviewed in the contemporary press, notably L'Art Moderne and the Journal de Bruxelles, even if they were seen to be eclectic and derivative of the works of older established artists.

This was the year in which he exhibited his highly controversial study for his painting  depicting a woman in labour. A contemporary review described it in the following: 'On a huge bed with purple sheets ... a dishevelled standing woman displays her nudity as she writhes in spasmodic movements, bending under the pains of childbirth. Her face is contorted, her gnashing teeth alternate with the curse, her clenched hands lift the bed cover over her belly in an unconscious reflex of modesty ... abominable vision ....! and poor women!' This subject, rarely depicted in art, was seen to be shocking and contrary to bourgeois taste. It does however signal an aspect of Delville's art to depict ideas that are vivid and provocative.

During the 1880s, Delville's work tended towards social realism. Here he focussed on themes of poverty, despair and hopelessness. In an undated drawing titled  Delville depicts a fallen figure curled up on his side in a barren landscape, asleep, or perhaps even dead. However, during the period 1888–1889 his artistic interests started developing in a more non-realist direction and began to move towards Idealism, which dominated his work from then on. This was first indicated in his  (now lost) displayed at L'Essor in 1889. The final work  (9 × 6 metres) was displayed at  the following year (1890) and was inspired by Dante's Divine Comedy. It depicts a vast composition of intertwined figures floating through the nether regions of hell. The theme concerns lovers who have succumbed to their erotic passions. One of the main themes of initiation is to control one's lower passions in order to achieve spiritual transcendence. This painting of this work represents this idea in metaphoric form. This is an early major work by Delville sadly destroyed in the incendiary attack on Louvain in 1914. Despite its importance, it was not received with much enthusiasm in the contemporary press.

Another work that display Delville's growing interest in non-realist ideas during the 1880s is his more well-known  (Royal Museums of Fine Art, Brussels, 1887). The work is inspired by Wagner's eponymous opera and deals with the relationship between love and death and the idea of transcendence that can be achieved through both. It is an early work that reveals themes closely related to the initiatory tradition which is fully discussed in Brendan Cole's recent book on Delville.

A further important work dealing with non-realist, or Idealist, subject matter was exhibited by Delville at the final  exhibition in 1891 titled  (the original is lost, but a detailed study recently came up for auction). It depicts a naked female figure dragging a nude male beneath the water. Bright light appears above the male figure while dark sub-aquatic vegetation surrounds the base of the female. The initiatory theme here is self-evident in its depiction of the conflict between spirit (light) and matter (dark vegetation). The male aspires towards the light but is dragged down towards the bottom of the dark mass of water. The work establishes an essential duality between consciousness/unconsciousness, light/dark, as well as spirituality and materialism. In Delville's writings he emphasises this duality and its reconciliation, a theme that pervades much of Symbolist art and writings and was conspicuous amongst Romantic artists as well, especially the writings of Goethe. The theme dominates Delville's art. He wrote that:
'Men have two very distinct trends in them. One of these two trends is physical, which must, of course, provide for his preservation by physical means, having the task of sustaining tangible life, sustaining the body. The other trend, which is not only immaterial but indefinable, is that which arises as a perpetual aspiration beyond the material, for which this world is not enough: it is this 'something else' that overcomes all distances or is, rather, unknowable. This is the very threshold of the occult world, in front of which all science, seized with unsteadiness, prostrates itself in the insuperable premonition of a world beyond!'

Pour L'Art 1892–1895
Many of the younger artists of  followed him which led to the dissolution of that group.  became one of the noted avant-garde exhibition societies on Brussels at the time. The leading avant-garde exhibition forum at the time was Les XX. Following ,  invited international artists as well, several of whom became well known in Symbolist circles, including Carlos Schwabe, Alexandre Séon, Charles Filiger and Jan Verkade. Their first exhibition took place in November 1892 and the works displayed were executed in either an Impressionist or Symbolist idiom. Delville designed the poster for the first exhibition depicting a long-necked sphinx – a key symbol of the period – cupping a flaming chalice in her hands. Delville's main work of that year was his  which can be considered one of the major images of the period. The new group received a largely positive press during the time. The group was closely associated with Joséphin Péladan's Salons de la Rose + Croix in Paris, and Péladan was frequently invited to lecture in Brussels at the time by members of the  group.

The second exhibition of the  group took place in January 1894. Significantly the society also included the applied, or decorative arts, which were become widely popular at the time and a particular feature of Art Nouveau. Tapestries, book-bindings, and wrought-iron work were displayed alongside the paintings. The influence of Delville and Péladan was evident in the predominance of idealist works of art influenced by late fifteenth-century Florentine art, the work of Gustave Moreau, Puvis de Chavannes and the tendency towards large-scale figure compositions. The show was enthusiastically received by the press.

Delville's main works exhibited that year were his celebrated  (1893, Royal Museums of Fine Art, Brussels) and his  or Portrait of Mrs Stuart Madame Stuart Merrill (1892, Royal Museums of Fine Art, Brussels). His work was enthusiastically praised in the press. The leading critic Ernest Verlant wrote:
 One of the principal members of the  group, in view of his talent and astonishing fecundity, is Jean Delville, who is also a writer and a poet; with a powerful imagination that is funereal and tormented. These works are monochrome, or nearly so. Their expression is accurate, fine, subtle, refined, not too explicit, and all the more eloquent.
The final  show took place in January 1895. Delville also participated for the last time in Péladan's . By this time the  salons were well-established, successful and enthusiastically supported by the contemporary press. Delville's  (1894, Royal Museums of Fine Art, Brussels), was Delville's main work of that show. Although not widely praised it stands, according to Brendan Cole, as one of his initiatory paintings  of Delville's .

Delville and Péladan's  1892–1895
Delville exhibited at Joséphin Péladan's  for the first four years of their existence (1892–1895), which coincided with his own  salons. At this time Delville was closely allied to Péladan and his ideals. Delville probably met Péladan in Paris when he accompanied one of the touring exhibitions of L'Essor, around 1888.

Delville shared Péladan's concept of creating a forum that showcased art of an exclusively Idealist persuasion. By 1896, Delville began severing formal ties with Péladan, which cleared the way for his move towards Theosophy later that decade. Delville records his association with Péladan in his autobiography: '... my personality as an idealist painter emerged more and more. I made the acquaintance of Péladan and became interested in and started participating in the esoteric movement in Paris and Brussels. I exhibited at the Rosicrucian Salon where only idealist art was allowed. Under his influence, I went to live in Paris where I stayed on the Quai Bourbon among some Rosicrucian friends, disciples of Péladan.

In 1892 Delville exhibited his  (which was reproduced in the catalogue to the first exhibition) as well as his . Many of these works would be displayed in Brussels as well in Delville's  exhibitions.

Prix de Rome and sojourn in Italy, 1895

Delville lived as an indigent artist in St Gilles in Brussels during the course of his early career. By the middle of the 1890s he was married and had a growing family which he struggled to support as an artist. On the advice of his close friend, the sculptor Victor Rousseau, he was motivated to enter the prestigious Prix de Rome, which came with a very generous bursary that also covered the costs for a lengthy sojourn in Italy. Delville won the 1895 competition, but his entry created a controversy amongst his peers given the 'Establishment' nature of the Prix that ran counter to the ideals of the avant-garde at the time. Delville was by then a fairly established figure in avant-garde circles and his association with the Prix de Rome appeared to be a betrayal of their cause. The Prix de Rome, however, also meant that Delville could spend a significant amount of time in Italy studying the Classical art of the Renaissance that he admired so much.

The rules of the competition were stringent. Competitors were isolated in small studios in the Academy of Fine Arts in Antwerp which ran the competition and were expected to produce a finished drawing of their composition before setting to work on the final painting. A strict time-limit was imposed on competitors to finish the work. The competition opened in June 1895 and the winner was announced in October. Delville recorded his experience in his autobiography:

The rules were demanding … At that time the six selected competitors for the final exam had to paint their work in a secluded lodge, after leaving the original preliminary drawing in a hallway of the Antwerp Academy. It was strictly forbidden to bring any drawings into the lodge, only live models were allowed there. While working on their painting, the competitors had to change their clothes each time they entered their lodge, after having been visited by a specially appointed supervisor. These procedural requirements were the moral guarantee of this great contest in which these artists from the country took part…. As soon as they were selected, they entered into a lodge in order to produce, over three days, the sketch of the requisite painting, and they were given eighty days to complete it without receiving any visitors or advice from anyone – in order to ensure that the competitors were the unique and personal author of the work so that the jury, composed of the country’s most well-known artists, could cast a definitive judgement.
During his stay Delville was expected to paint original works reflecting his studies of classical art as well as to make copies after the old masters. He was also expected to send regular reports back to the Antwerp Academy relating to his work there. The experience proved to be a turning point in his career and brought to focus his ideal to synthesise the classical tendency in art with his interest in esoteric philosophy which was the defining attribute of his Idealist aesthetic form then onwards. Delville produced several remarkable paintings during his time in Rome that reflect a dramatic evolution in his art towards a more refined expression of this Idealist aesthetic. These included his outstanding  (1896), a key initiatory work, as well as his great masterpiece of the period, his  (1898), which he exhibited at the 1898  to universal praise. In 1895, Delville published his first book on esoteric philosophy, .

The  1896–1898
Delville's  were exclusively devoted to exhibiting artwork of an Idealist nature. Delville signalled his programme in a series of polemical articles during the course of the months preceding the opening of the first Salon, which created some controversy amongst his contemporaries. Delville's ideas were bold and confrontational, but it was characteristic of him to stick to the courage of his convictions and to carry his projects through with relentless energy and determination. The aim of the Salons were couched in a short manifesto published before the opening of the first Salon. This is an early instance of a new avant-garde art movement supported by a manifesto, something that would be a commonplace in later Modernist movements and after. The salons were also accompanied by a series of lectures and musical soirées. Delville's salons were also significant for their inclusion of women artists, something almost unheard of in other contemporary avant-garde exhibition societies. The manifesto provides a valuable record of the Idealist movement founded by Delville:
They bring together, in one annual grouping, all the scattered elements of artistic idealism, that is to say, works with the same leanings towards beauty. Wishing in this way to react against the decadence, against the confusion of the so-called realist, impressionist or libriste schools (degenerate art forms), the  champion the following as eternal principles of perfection in a work of art: thought, style, and technique. The only thing they recognize as free, within aesthetics, is the creative personality of the artist, and maintain, in the name of harmony, that no work is susceptible to true art unless it is composed of the three absolute terms, namely: spiritual beauty, plastic beauty and technical beauty. Similar, if not identical, to the Parisian Rose & Croix Salons created by Sâr Joséphin Péladan and to the Pre-Raphaelite movement in London, the  claim to wish to continue, through modern developments, the great tradition of idealist art, from the ancient masters to present-day masters.
Delville's main work exhibited that year was his visionary  (1895, Royal Museums of Fine Art, Brussels). The work had previously been on show at the Salon de Gand. The depiction of a satanic figure represented under water was unique in Western Art. Instead of wings he is represented with long octopus tentacles. His 'treasures' are the sleeping figures surrounded with jewels and gold coins, objects representing materialism and avarice. The figures show no sign of torment, but are rather represented in a state of somnolent bliss, as though they have succumbed to all that is 'satanic' in Delville's occult view: sensual pleasure and materialism. The work is an apotropaic icon against the snares of the lower passions and the world of matter and sensuality generally.

The second Salon took place in March 1897 at Edmond Picard's arts venue, . At the time Delville was in Italy on his prescribed sojourn there after winning the coveted Prix de Rome. The show received largely positive reviews in the press and Delville's Salons were becoming more widely accepted, despite his aggressive polemics in the months prior to their establishment which hackled his contemporaries. What was noted as a feature of this Idealist art was its intellectual nature and the proclivity towards the expression of ideas.

The final  took place in March 1898 and was marked by the exhibition of Delville's great masterpiece, his  (1898, Musée D'Orsay), which marked the culmination of his Idealist programme and widely celebrated amongst his contemporary critics, even those who were previously hostile to his art and aesthetic programme.

After 1900
In 1895 Delville published his , a text in which he outlined his views on occultism and esoteric philosophy. Brendan Cole discusses this text in detail his book on Delville, pointing out that, though the Dialogue reflects the ideas of a number of occultists, it also reveals a new interest in Theosophy. In the late 1890s, Delville joined the Theosophical Society. He was probably introduced to Theosophy directly through his friendship with Edouard Schuré, the author of the widely influential book . Schuré wrote the preface to Delville's work on Idealist Art,  (1900). Delville also came into close alliance with Annie Besant who inherited the leadership of the Theosophical movement. Besant gave a series of lectures in Brussels in 1899 titled . Delville reviewed her talks in an article published in  that year. It is probably from this point onwards that Delville became actively involved in the Theosophical Movements as such. Delville founded , a journal devoted to Theosophical ideas in 1899, and published articles from leading Theosophists of the day, including Besant. Delville became the first General Secretary of the Belgian branch of the Theosophical Society in 1911.
Delville's art flourished after 1900 and he produced some of his greatest works during this period up to the First World War. His most striking achievement, however, is his series of five vast canvases that decorated the Cour d'Assises in the Palais de Justice on the theme of 'Justice through the Ages'. These works, monumental in conception and scale and no doubt amongst his finest, were unfortunately destroyed during the second World War as a result of German bombing of the Palais de Justice on 3 September 1944. The irony of this action in relation to the theme of this cycle of paintings cannot be overlooked. Small-scale replacements were installed during the reconstruction of the Palais after the War. The gigantic original central painting, titled , measured 11 metres by 4.5 metres.

Professor at the Glasgow School of Art, 1900–1906

Delville hoped to secure a teaching place at the Academy in Brussels, but was offered instead a teaching position at the flourishing Glasgow School of Art in 1900. His tenure there was highly successful, and the works of the students he trained were celebrated at the annual exhibitions in London. When Delville returned to Brussels in 1907, many of his British students followed him to further their training under his tutelage in his private studio in rue Morris. At that time, Delville fulfilled his ambition to teach at the Brussels Academy and was appointed Professor of Life Studies, a post he held until his retirement in 1937.

The First World War: Exile in London 1914–1918
When war broke out, Delville, amongst many Belgians, was welcomed in Britain as exiles. He moved there with his entire family, including his wife and four younger children and settled in Golders Green in London. His two oldest sons, Elie and Raphaël Delville, were conscripted into the Belgian war effort (both survived the conflict). Delville played an active role in London through his writings, art and public addresses (he was a gifted orator) in support of the Belgians in exile and the conflict against the Germans. He contributed to the Belgian expatriate newspaper in London, L'Indépendence Belge and wrote several articles and poems virulently condemning German aggression. He was an active member of the philanthropic society for Belgian refugees, and was the president of  that was responsible for the creation of the successful publication Belgian Art in Exile, the sale of which raised money for Belgian charities in England. The work contains a great number of representative paintings and other works of art by contemporary Belgian artists. The volume was generally well received. The Sketch ran a supportive editorial in their January edition and gave informative information about the volume:
Belgian Art in Exile is the title of a very attractive album of reproductions, mostly in colour, of paintings by exiled Belgian artists, with photographs of works by Belgian sculptors, which has been issued in aid of the Belgian Red Cross and other Belgian charitable institutions. The colour-plates, which are beautifully reproduced, show the high quality and great versatility of modern Belgian art. Particularly notable is a picture of a Moorish cavalry charge, by Alfred Bastien, who since he came to this country has done some fine work for the Illustrated London News. Among many other well-known Belgian artists represented are Albert Baertsoen, Jean Delville, Emile Claus, Herman Richir, Comte Jacques de Lalaing, and Paul Dubois. A fine painting by Frank Brangwyn – Mater Dolorosa Belgica – forms a pictorial introduction", as the frontispiece. Maeterlinck contributes a eulogy of King Albert, and there are poems by Emile Verhaeren, Marcel Wyseur, and Jean Delville, who also writes an introduction. The volume is published by Colour (25, Victoria Street, S.W. at 5s. and (in cloth) 73. 6d., with a limited edition de luxe at £1. Both for itself and the cause it should command a wide sale.

At that time Delville was also an active Freemason and was involved in La Loge Albert 1er that reunited Belgian Freemasons in exile living in Britain. His most notable work of this period is his  (completed in 1924), depicting two vast celestial armies confronting each other. The forces of light, represented on the right, are led by a Christ-like figure seated on a horse and a torch-bearing winged figure leading an army of angels into the fray against a battalion of dark forces streaming in from the left. The work is on open display in the Palais de Justice in the vast  and is grand in scale, measuring 5 metres by 8 metres.

The  1920
From an early point in his career Delville was interested in producing art that would be displayed in public spaces for the edification of all. For him, art was a means of uplifting the public, and to this end he despised art that was produced for an elite clique, sold by dealers for the benefit of collectors who saw in art no more than an investment opportunity. Delville's ideals were strongly aligned to the idea of a social purpose for art, about which he wrote extensively during his career. In his  he wrote: 'If the purpose of Art, socially speaking, is not to spiritualise the weighted thinking of the public, then one has the right to ask oneself, what is truly its usefulness, or more precisely, its purpose'.
The aim of the group was to bring together painters, artists and architects who would draw attention to the need for art specifically created for public buildings.

An important realisation of this aim was the decoration of the walls in the colonnades of the hemicycles flanking the Arcade of the Parc du Cinquantenaire. Five artists collaborated with Delville on this project: Constant Montald, Emile Vloors, Omer Dierickx, Emile Fabry and Albert Ciamberlani. The last two were friends of Delville's since his days at the academy and had collaborated on many project before. Most of these artists had also exhibited in Delville's Idealist forums,  and the  during the 1890s.

The project went ahead under the patronage of King Albert I, and was paid for through a scheme of national subscription.

The overall theme of this major cycle of works was a patriotic commemoration of  'The Glorification of Belgium' following the Great War through allegorical images relating to war and peace. In 1924 Delville expressed his idea for the cycle as a 'vision of a frieze in mosaic unfurling its rhythm of lines and its harmony of colours between the columns of the hemicycle'.
 
Each artist prepared six individual works (cartoons) that were then adapted to the final mosaics which were three metres high and aligned to the top part of the wall. The total distance of all the mosaics was 120 metres. An overall harmony of all the individual panels was achieved by ensuring that the artists adhered to a few common rules of composition: using the same horizon line, using the same scale for the figures, and adhering to a limited palette of related colours. The specific theme to the left of the arcade is that of Belgium at peace. Works by Fabry, Vloors and Montald represent respectively material life, intellectual life and moral life. The specific theme to the right represents heroic Belgium, with works by Delville, Ciamberlani and Dierickx representing respectively victory, a tribute to heroes and war.

The project was conceived between 1922 and 1926 and completed in 1932. The mosaics themselves were executed by Jean Lahaye and Emile Van Asbroeck of the company A Godchol.

This monumental creation was a vindication of Idealist trends in art presented in a public space and gave his artistic perspective a wider visibility amongst the general public.

Working towards the public good and alleviating the suffering of mankind was also a principle ideal of the Theosophists, an ideal to which Delville's subscribed throughout his life.

Later years
From the 1920s onwards, Delville experienced a much more settled and successful career than ever before. With the highly successful completion of the two major public projects in the Palais de Justice and the Cinquantenaire, and his election as a member of the prestigious Belgian Royal Academy of sciences and letters in 1924, he seemed to have been drawn much closer into the Belgian establishment during these years.

He was still able to sustain a power of expression and a highly articulate finish to his works in his later years that was there from the very start. However, a change in his style took place amongst some of his works in the 1930s, (especially while he was resident in Mons). Characteristically they became more pared-down in their articulation of form and colour: shapes became more stylised and geometric and his colours were more pallid, or 'pastel' in tone, lacking the energy, vibrant contrasts and rich tonalities that was characteristic of his work until then. His treatment of figures also became more stylised and he often articulated their facial features with characteristically 'almond'-shaped eyes, giving his figures an otherworldly appearance.

Delville remained a committed and passionate Theosophist until his death in 1953 and he maintained in one of his biographies that this always formed the foundation to this moral and artistic perspective throughout his later life. Regarding this important aspect of his intellectual and spiritual life, he wrote in 1944:

Delville died on his birthday, 19 January 1953.

Honours 
 1919 : Officer of the Order of the Crown.

Theory and technique

Idealist theory
Delville wrote prolifically throughout his life outlining his Idealist aesthetic. His first main publication on the subject was his  (1900). Delville's Idealist theory is a syncretic formulation of traditional Idealist thinking (in the tradition of Plato, Schopenhauer and Hegel) and contemporary esoteric philosophy.
In summary, Delville believed that art is the expression of the Ideal (or spiritual) in material form and is founded on the principle of Ideal Beauty, in other words Beauty that is the manifestation of the Ideal, or spiritual realm, in physical objects. Contemplating objects that manifest Ideal Beauty allows us to perceive, if only fleetingly, the spiritual dimension and we are transfigured as a result.

Delville outlines this in a vivid passage in his  where he emphasises the expressive value of Idealist art, in other words, that it is not merely a question of engaging passively with the image, but it is also about feeling the 'energy' that it radiates, which uplifts and transforms the consciousness of the viewer, in a spiritual way. Idealism in art is, he writes, 'the introduction of Spirituality into Art'. For Delville, the Idea is an expression of the Ideal realm, and it is a living force within human experience that dwells within the transpersonal realm of human experience. He writes further that:
The Idea, in the metaphysical or esoteric sense, is Force, the universal and divine force which moves worlds, and its movement is the supreme rhythm whence springs the harmonious working of Life.

Where there is no thought, there is no life, no creation. The modern western world has become unconscious of this tremendous power of the Ideal, and Art inevitably has thus become degraded. This ignorance of the creative forces of thought has, nevertheless, obscured and diverted towards materialism all modern judgement. Materialism does not know how ideas and thoughts vibrate, and how these vibrations impinge on the consciousness of the individual.

And yet these vibrations, though invisible to the greater part of mankind, are able to exercise an astounding influence over the mentality of human beings, and thus assist in their evolution. Before works of genius the human consciousness receives mental and spiritual vibrations, which are generated by the force of the idea reflected. The more elevated, pure and sublime a work is, the more the inner being, coming into contact with the ideal vibrations emanated from it, will be raised, purified, and made sublime. The artist who is not ideal, that is to say, artist who does not know that every form must be the result of an idea, and that every idea must have its form, the artist, in short, who does not know that Beauty is the luminous conception of equilibrium in forms, will never have any influence over the soul, because his works will be really without thought, that is, without life.

The Idea is the emotion of the Spirit as Emotion is the reflex of the Soul.

Delville goes further by dividing his understanding of beauty into three categories: I) spiritual beauty: the source of beauty in physical objects, ii) formal beauty: the physical articulation of beauty in works of art, and iii) technical beauty: the specific execution of line, colour, light and shade, and composition to express Ideal beauty in physical objects and works of art.
Delville goes further to map his threefold conception of beauty onto his esoteric conception of the threefold nature of reality, consisting of the natural, human and divine realms, as well as the threefold nature of man as body (senses), soul (feeling) and mind (thought and spirituality). He writes:
The work of Idealist Art is therefore that which will harmonise in itself the three great Words of Life: the Natural, the Human and the Divine. To attain this degree of aesthetic balance, –  which, I am happy to concede, is not within the reach of just anyone! – one must find within the work the purest idea on an intellectual level, the most beautiful form within the artistic realm, and the most perfect technique in terms of execution. Without an idea, a work misses its intellectual mission, without form, it misses its natural mission and, without technique, it misses its goal of perfection. … The veritable character of the work of Idealist Art can be identified from the balance reigning over its accomplishment, meaning that it does not let the essential terms of idea, art or technique prevail one over the other, but more likely according to relations proportional to their respective powers.

The Classical tradition
Delville believed that the purest expression of Idealist art was to be found in the Classical tradition of ancient Greek art and the High Renaissance. For him, Classical art was the purest expression of the spiritual in material form. Delville sought to reinterpret the Classical idiom in a contemporary context – to suit, in other words, his specific Idealist style of art that he was formulating during the 1890s – not simply, in other words, to copy or imitate classical modes of art. The expression of harmony and equilibrium, which he saw as an essential aspect of Classical art, were fundamental in the expression of the spiritual in natural forms. There is a mystical aspect to Delville's aesthetic, and idea of Ideal Beauty, when he wrote that:
The Beautiful, taken in its classical sense, is not an illusion. The Beautiful is the True manifested by the Idea in form. This is the highest goal that the artist must seek to attain … When the artist causes light to spring forth from darkness, beauty from ugliness, the pure from the impure, he reveals Truth to humanity, he reveals God. The Beautiful, the True, the Good are synonyms. It is the glory of Art to be able to make perceptible to human eyes the three mysteries which form a single one!

Idealist art
Delville developed a distinct style in his painting, which is unmistakable. His finished drawing and paintings are highly articulate and precise in the way he renders forms. However, his works are not overbearingly detailed, as is often found in realist art, but he manages to capture the essence of the forms he articulates using the simplest means possible. This is especially so in his approach to figures. In his  he outlines the figures using long, curvaceous contours, and their anatomy is only lightly suggested using gentle contrasts in light and shade; the effect is the expression of great beauty without being overbearingly sensual: a technique often seen in Renaissance frescos. Delville had a great imagination for colour and its use for expressive purposes. His colours are often vivid, almost visionary, most clearly seen in his  which is bathed in an atmosphere of luminous golds and yellows. In his  he captures the effect of iridescent, diaphanous gold in the angel's drapery contrasting distinctly with the heavy earthiness of the natural details (animals, spiders, vegetation) at bottom right hand side. His  is a paradigm of serenity in his use of muted, cool colours and pastel shades to emphasise the intellectual idyll of Plato's Akademos.

Delville very seldom painted landscapes, still life or portraits for their own sake, but often incorporated these in his figure paintings. Almost all of Delville's paintings focus on the human form as the bearer of the drama of his works. He was a master of the articulation of human anatomy which he used to express vividly his Idealist technique and ideas. The various ways he articulates the human form is key to understanding his artistic programme that he unveiled in his paintings throughout his career.

Practise: idealist artworks

Mysteriosa or The Portrait of Mrs. Stuart Merrill (1892)

Pencil, pastel and coloured pencil on paper, 40 x 32.1 cm, Brussels: Royal Museum of Fine Art

Though Delville frequently wrote about his ideas, he almost never discussed his paintings. He left the interpretations to the viewer, and as a result his best pictures have an air of mystery and intrigue. One of the most mysterious is his portrait of Mrs. Stuart Merrill. This drawing, executed in chalks in 1892, is strikingly otherworldly. In it Delville depicts the young woman as a medium in trance, with her eyes turned upwards. Her radiating red-orange hair combines with the fluid light of her aura.

The hot colours which surround Mrs. Merrill's head appear to allude to the earthly fires of passion and sensuality. On the other hand, the book on which she rests her chin and long, almost spectral hands is inscribed with an upwards-pointing triangle. This represents Delville's idea of perfect human knowledge, achieved (as he says in his Dialogue), through magic, the Kabbalah and Hermeticism. As a number of authors have pointed out, the painting, with its references to occultism and wisdom seems to hint at initiation. If so, the woman's red aura might refer to her sensual side, which will become more spiritualised as she moves into a different stage of development.

Whatever its interpretation, this very unusual portrait has had a strong effect on viewers. It can be seen as eerie and supernatural (Bade, Femme Fatale, 1979), or as "a positively magical vision" (Jullian, Dreamers of Decadence, 1974). It is sometimes referred to as the Mona Lisa of the 1890s, and is also given the title . Today, few details are available about the sitter, and even her first name goes unmentioned in the literature. The most extensive information on her identity is given by Delville's son Olivier in his biography of the painter. It is not a first-hand account, however, as Olivier was born at least ten years after the picture was executed. According to him, Stuart Merrill (a Symbolist poet who published his works in Paris and Brussels) had a house near to the Delvilles in Forest at that time. Olivier adds that "the young Mrs Merrill-Rion" was a Belgian, and that Delville was struck by her strange beauty and depicted her with a mediumistic character. It is likely that Delville painted other portraits of Mrs Stuart Merrill and the 1893 drawing 'Medusa', in the same media is undoubtedly one of these.

The painting was not bought by the Merrills, and remained with the Delvilles until it was sold to a Californian private collector in the late 1960s. In 1998, it was acquired by the Brussels Museum of Fine Arts, and is now on display to the public.

The Angel of Splendour (1894)

Oil in canvas, 127 x 146 cm, Brussels: Museum of Fine Art.

This is undoubtedly one of Delville's most visionary images of the early 1890s. The work refers to Delville's interests in the idea of initiation and the spiritualisation of the soul. As seen in many of his works, Delville often plays on the tension between opposites: light and dark, spirit and matter, Nature and the Ideal, etc. These ideas are personified in this work in the duality between the androgynous Angel and the young androgynous youth who is ensnared in the natural or material realm. His lower torso is engulfed in serpents and surrounded by toads, spiders, butterflies and other life-forms of the natural world. The Angel, on the other hand is a vision of diaphanous gold, clothed in a dress that is more fluid than material, emanating a soft, but intense, light. Her face is of the exquisite beauty commonly seen in Renaissance portraiture, notably in the work of Leonardo, whom Delville admired. The bright aureole that surrounds her face beaming light in all directions is a common signifier of her spiritual nature. Her proportions are odd, by human standards, and they were criticised by his contemporaries, but Delville understood that to humanise the angel would be to contradict her symbolic function in this work. She remains a being who is physically of her own, transcendental, realm.  She points upwards indicating the path to the Ideal realm of spirit and beauty while the youth reaches towards her in an attempted gesture to release himself from the material snares that envelop him from below. There is an obvious tension here, as it is not entirely clear whether the youth will make it, or sink back into the deadening material realm from which he is emerging. The first step on the path of initiation and transcendence is to overcome and control the limitations of the illusory material dimension, and specifically to control the passions and desires, in order to clear the path for the transcendence of the soul. This painting is a totem of that moment in the initiatory drama that Delville expressed in many of his paintings and poems at the time.

Sathan’s Treasures (1895)

Oil on canvas, 258 x 268 cm, Brussels: Museum of Fine Art

Delville exhibited his  (Sathan's Treasures) at the Salon de Gand in September 1895 while he was working on his entry for the Belgian Prix de Rome. It was then exhibited in Brussels for the first time in 1896 at Delville's first . This was one of Delville's first 'breakthrough' paintings and one of his most important works from his artistic period up to 1895.

On the whole, Delville's works generally deal with the theme of the duality between nature (human or otherwise) and the transcendental world. Delville was an Idealist, in other words, he believed in the reality of a transcendental or spiritual dimension as the basis of reality. Our perceptual material world is, in this world-view, seen merely an illusion that brings suffering and discontent. Our goal is to spiritualise our being and refine our material selves, which includes our desires and need for the fulfillment of material satisfaction. Without a spiritual context in mind, men and women simply become deadened materialistic entities always governed by their desires, passions, greed and ego-driven need for control and power over others. This is the realm of matter, or in Delville's cosmology, the realm of Sathan, who controls and governs our lower state of being. Without a spiritual goal in life, we are merely slaves to Sathan and are completely submissive to his power; we become his 'treasure' as is implied in the title of this painting. Here Delville depicts Sathan as a rather attractive figure, beguiling, powerful and seductive, dragging the hapless mass of men and woman to his undersea lair. Significantly the figures are not in a state of pain or agony, as is usually the case in Western depictions of Satan's underworld. Here they appear to be in a state of reverie and bliss, unconscious of their lives and the value of the spiritual reality of their existence, and succumbing, rather, entirely to the lure of gold and sensual pleasure; in other words, material greed and sensualism that Delville saw as a trap and a catastrophic diversion from humanity's true goal which is to spiritualise one's being and enter the higher realm of consciousness and spiritual bliss which he referred to as the 'Ideal'.

The theme of exercising control over one's lower nature, of erotic temptation and indulgence was believed by Delville and his esoteric contemporaries (especially Joséph Péladan) to represent the first stage on the path of initiation. This was first suggested in Edouard Schuré's influential work The Great Initiates and outlined in a passage reconstructing the Egyptian initiatory trials. He recounts how the final trial is set to resist erotic temptation personified in the form of an alluring female figure.

Delville expressed these ideas in an article published in the contemporary journal  in 1893:
Erotic fever has sterilised most minds. One ordinarily thinks of himself as virile because he satisfies a woman’s unquenched bestial desires. Well, that’s where the great shame of the cerebral degeneration of our time starts. The poet, the artist, the scientist are mostly attached to the spiritual functions rather than the emasculating animal functions. The real male is he whose mind can dominate the body and who only responds to solicitations of the flesh as his will allows. … if the works of the Sar, a virile man if ever there was one, energetically banish sexual conflicts, that is, are a consistent plea in favour of chastity, it is because he has studied the ravages of carnal love, because he has understood that one has to beware of the feelings of the heart, a heart in love being a dangerous accomplice of instinct. … Unfortunately, for the most part, we remain stubbornly ignorant of the fact that real virginity develops highly the powers of the soul, and that, to those who dedicate themselves to it, it imparts faculties unknown to the rest of the human race.

There are also frequent references to 'Sathan' in Delville's 1897 anthology of poems , for example his "", "", "" and "". This last vividly evokes the motif that runs throughout Delville's writings:

""

"The Dark Star" (translation)

The School of Plato (1898)
Oil on canvas, 260 x 605 cm, Paris: Musée D'Orsay

In this important painting, Delville invokes the serene beauty of the Classical world and its aesthetic and philosophical principles. Delville painted this work while he was in Italy on his artistic sojourn there after winning the coveted Belgian Prix de Rome. Delville was then, at last, able to study the classical works of the Renaissance and the ancient world that profoundly influenced his artistic ideas.

The scale of the painting is impressive, measuring 2.60 metres high by 6.05 metres long, and Delville certainly had in mind large-scale academic history paintings which were the preserve of erudite artistic subjects painted in the Classical tradition, which he sought to renew. The figures depicted are almost life-size. The style of the painting is inspired by the Italian frescoes by Raphael and Michelangelo that Delville would have seen while in Rome, characterised by bold articuation of forms with a matte (as opposed to a glossy) finish. The painting was first exhibited at Delville's final  in Brussels in 1898. The work was universally praised as a masterpiece by his contemporaries. The leading avant-garde art journal , which was frequently hostile towards Delville and his art, praised his work in the following: 'Jean Delville ... has created a Work! A superb work of art: The School of Plato, to which he refers as "an essay in Fresco" – Go and see it! It is of a calm, a serene, a grand and delicious Beauty ... Ideal, yes, truly ideal. The programme shows his worth and it is magnificent.... It is beautiful, beautiful, beautiful!

Delville was immersed in studying the esoteric tradition and the hidden philosophies that were popular at the time. This was a tradition that extolled the virtues of self-improvement and spiritual progress through initiation. Edouard Schuré already identified Plato as one of the 'Great Initiates', in other words, light-bearers who guide humanity towards higher consciousness and deeper spiritual awareness during our earthly incarnation. Plato taught of the essential duality between the material and metaphysical dimensions; his gesture, pointing upwards and downwards, alludes to this duality between macrocosm and microcosm. Attainment of the Ideal realm and the expression of its truths in physical form was the key notion in Delville's aesthetic philosophy. He wrote often that the goal of art should aspire towards expressing Absolute, or Spiritual Beauty in physical form. He saw Classical art as the purest expression of this goal and he sought a revival of this idea in art, reworking it in a way that was appropriate for his contemporary cultural era. For Delville, moreover, the human body, was the purest expression of Ideal and Spiritual Beauty. He therefore often resorted to the depiction of nude male and female figures in his art as vehicles for the expression of this ideal, as is clearly seen in this work. Concerning the spiritual importance of the nude as a vehicle for the expression of a spiritual ideal, he wrote:
The nude has the high quality of being synthetic and universal. … in evoking Mankind, it evokes Humanity and all the beauty of Life, not life as we modern beings understand it, comprising nerves, morbid fevers and agitation, but the great universal life, which enriches the spirit and the earth, makes stars and souls resplendent and makes space vibrate, which beats in substance as in essence, which rules and moves the Universe, the beings and the objects, mortal or immortal, in the infinite rhythm and the mystery of Eternity, divine macrocosm and human microcosm where Universal Beauty, made of Love, Wisdom and Light, shines and is reflected forever.

The men in this painting are conceived in an idealised androgynous form: a concept that Delville, following Péladan, developed to express the ideal of a non-erotic perfection of the human state that synthesises the male and female principle in an idea of wholeness and perfection, which emulates the original state of human perfection that precedes our split, dual experience of reality in our earthly incarnation.

The Love of Souls (1900) 
Tempera and oil on canvas, 268 x 150 cm. Brussels: Musée communal des beaux-arts d'Ixelles.

This is undoubtedly one of Delville's most subtly articulated and beautiful images of the period. Delville depicts the union of souls, male and female, in a cosmic setting. This painting suggests a theme important to Delville and his contemporaries regarding the return to unity in the dual male and female principles of human experience that results in spiritual androgyny. Male energy and female energy are united to form a state of wholeness and complete unity of Being. It is a cosmic conception of the goal of existence, beyond opposites, polarity and discord. This state signifies a return to the original state of perfection and integration of opposites that unites us to the Cosmic mind, beyond time and space and the duality of physical and material existence. This spiritual union gives birth to the transcendent being, the cosmic Christ within. Delville often wrote of the nature of duality and the forces of opposites, as well as the need to bring these into harmony, in other words achieving Equilibrium. In fact, he understood the experience of opposition in nature (human as well as in the natural world) as an underlying 'law' relating to what he termed the 'Equilibrium in the Universal Order', with regard to which, he wrote:

In spite of a contrary appearance, all the forces, all the manifestations of nature influence each other with currents of negative polarity and positive polarity, undeniable astral influences. … The great contrasts of life, however, are responsible for all the misery, all the hardship; are they responsible for the production of Chaos?

A huge mistake: The Great and the Small, the Strong and the Weak, the High and the Low, the Active and the Passive, the Full and the Empty, the Weighty and the Dense, Exterior and Interior, the Visible and the Invisible, the Beautiful and the Ugly, the Good and the Bad, Essence and Substance, Spirit and Matter are divergent forces which eternally constitute the great Equilibrium in the Universal Order. It is a Natural Law, and no philosophy, no dogma, no doctrine will ever prevail over It.

The setting of this work is important. Delville places the figures in an indeterminate, cosmic setting, suggesting that they are not figures that have human substance, but are rather symbols of the transcendent spiritual nature of man and woman. The ribbons of colour surrounding them suggests a fluid energy field upon which they are buoyed, an idea that Delville and his contemporaries often referred to as 'astral light' – an energy-force that animates living entities, much like the idea of 'the field' in quantum physics.

Delville painted this work in tempera, where pigments are mixed with egg white to create a luminous finish and a highly durable work of art. He was highly influenced by the artists of the Italian Renaissance who often used tempera in their works, and which, to this day, retain their purity of colour and luminosity to a high degree. The close-up details reveal his technique of applying the paint in small strokes; rather than blending the colours on the palette, they are blended by the eye. To achieve this effect one has to be highly skilled as a draughtsman.

Character
In his biography, Delville's son Olivier tells us that his father, determined to pass his ideals on to the world, was continually painting and writing. He supplemented this unreliable income by teaching art, but his busy professional life did not prevent him from applying his strongly held beliefs to his personal life. Olivier describes his father as a person of courage, perseverance, probity and intellect, as well as an upright family man who was strict with his six children.

Legacy
Delville is still not nearly as well known as some of his contemporaries of the Symbolist era. There are historical reasons for this. The reputations of many of his contemporaries, like Khnopff, Mellery and Ensor, were largely founded on their participation at these societies, which promoted heavily their art through organised marketing campaigns, and by establishing a commercial network of dealers and collectors to invest in the art exhibited there. They were also very successful in making their art well known internationally. There was an overt commercial element associated with these societies in the way they created an aura about the art exhibited there as a desirable commodity. Delville shunned the commercialisation of art and the way it was manufactured as an elite commodity. Delville was mainly committed to using art as a force to transform society and to improve the lives of those around him. He wrote: 'there will be nothing to prevent art increasingly to become an educative force in society, conscious of its mission. It is time to penetrate society with art, with the ideal and with beauty. Today's society tends to fall increasingly into instinct. It is saturated with materialism, sensualism and ... commercialism'.

Delville believed, rather, that a respiritulaisation of society would be a redeeming path to rescue it from the morbidity of materialism. Elsewhere he wrote: 'Idealism ... has a universalizing educational and social impact ... Idealism sees humanity in terms of the immense vitality of his ideal future. In order for the artist to become aware of this, it is necessary for him to purify and elevate himself. ... The role of modern idealism will be to draw the artistic temperament away from the deadly epidemics of materialism ... and finally to guide him towards the purified regions of an art that is the harbinger of future spirituality.'

Delville remained desperately poor during the early part of his career and his condition was only occasionally relieved by the stipend associated with the Prix de Rome that he won as well as his employment at the Glasgow School of Art, and later the Ecole des beaux-arts. Delville never sold to dealers and only very seldom took on private commissions for portraits (a genre he would have excelled in). Most of his paintings were on a grand scale and he devised these mostly to be exhibited in public spaces, following his ideal of the social role of art. Thus, the poor reputation associated with Delville's art is in part probably related to the lack of any committed exposure and sustained marketing of his work, which was essential in forging the reputations of the early avant garde and afterwards. Delville also came from a working-class background which was a huge disadvantage in the contemporary bourgeois-dominated culture in Belgium. This would certainly have contributed to the erasure of his worth as an artist over time. Finally, Delville was fiercely independent in his approach to promoting his ideas and artistic ideals, seldom bending to the will of what was popular or acceptable in conservative bourgeois circles that controlled and dominated the art market during his formative years. Mainstream critics and peers generally shunned his art and ideals as a result. Despite his immense talent and vision, Delville remained a 'voice in the wilderness' during this time. This reputation persisted during the course of his life and afterwards as well.

Another great disadvantage related to Delville's reputation relates to the limited exposure of his major works in public museums, and the relative paucity of published material (until recently) concerning Delville's art and career. The Museum of Fine Art in Brussels houses by far more works than any public collection, but few of these are on public display. This is also the case in other centres in Belgium (Bruges and Antwerp, for example). Few of his works are to be seen in major museums outside Belgium, with the exception of his  in the Musée d'Orsay in Paris. Many of his smaller works have long since disappeared or have been destroyed, which leaves conspicuous lacunae in his catalogue of extant works. Moreover, a great number of his works are in private collections and their whereabouts still needs to be determined. This all means that access to his works is extremely limited and they remain out of the 'public eye', and hence the collective imagination generally. Reproductions of some of his paintings and drawings are available on the Internet, but are usually of poor quality which reduces their impact considerably. Finally, until very recently, there have been no major studies or monographs on the artist's work, which until now has left considerable gaps in the understanding of his life, art and ideas.

Despite this, a resurgence of interest in his work and ideas appears to be taking place, notably with the recent important retrospective exhibition in Namur that brought together many important paintings and drawings, many of which have not been seen before in public since they were first exhibited in the nineteenth century. Several Belgian and English art historians, working in collaboration with Delville's heirs and estate, are also taking a renewed interest in Delville's work, revealing detailed aspects of his life and work for the first time through detailed studies and monographs on aspects of Delville's life and art (see 'Sources').

Selected works of art

Prints and drawings
  (1887), charcoal on paper, 33 x 34.5 cm. Brussels: Musée d'Ixelles, inv. CL240
  (1887), pencil and charcoal on paper, 44.3 x 75.4 cm. Brussels: Royal Museums of Fine Arts of Belgium, inv. 7927.
  (1888), charcoal, 44 x 57 cm. Private collection (Portrait of his grandmother on her death bed)
  (1888), pencil on paper, 48.2 x 66.2 cm. Tournai: Musée des beaux-arts.
  (1890), pencil on paper, 8.7 x 10.7 cm. Tournai: Musée des Beaux-arts.
 , (1890). Private collection. 
  (1890), charcoal on paper, 70.7 x 56 cm. Private collection.
  (1891), pencil on paper, 98.5 x 56.5 cm. Private collection.
  (1891), pencil, ink and mixed media, 15.2 x 35.6 cm. Chicago: Chicago Institute of Art.
Brussels: Royal Museums of Fine Arts of Belgium, inv. 12029.

Paintings
  (1886)
  (1887), oil on canvas, 80x100 cm. Private collection (recently rediscovered).
  (1890), location unknown.
  (1893), oil on canvas, 79.3 x 99.2 cm. Brussels: Royal Museums of Fine Arts of Belgium, inv. 12209.
  (1894), oil on canvas, 222 x 247 cm. Antwerp: Academy of Fine Arts (Prix de Rome entry).
  (1894), oil on canvas, 127 x 146 cm. Brussels: Royal Museums of Fine Arts of Belgium, inv. GC179.
 , 1894, oil on canvas, 242 x 112 cm. Nîmes: musée des Beaux-arts
 , 1895, oil on canvas, 258 x 268 cm. Brussels: Royal Museums of Fine Arts of Belgium, inv. 4575. 
  (1896), oil on canvas, 118 x 170 cm. Private collection.
 , (1898), oil on canvas, 260 x 605 cm. Paris: Musée d'Orsay, inv. RF1979-34.
  (1900), tempera and oil on canvas, 268 x 150 cm. Brussels: Musée communal des beaux-arts d'Ixelles, inv. 1942.
 , (1903), oil on canvas, 500 x 500 cm. Bruges: Groeningemuseum. 
  (1907), oil on canvas, 500 x 250 cm. Brussels: Université Libre de Bruxelles.
 , (1911–1914) Palais de Justice, Brussels; destroyed by German bombing at the end of WWII
  (1913), oil on canvas, 169 x 146 cm. Private collection.
  (1914/18), oil on canvas, 460 x 350 cm (?). Brussels: Palais de Justice.
  (1916), oil on canvas, 177 x 127 cm. Location unknown.
 , (1916). Brussels: Royal Museums of Fine Arts of Belgium.
  (1918), oil on canvas, 305 x 205. Brussels, Royal Academy of Fine Art.
  (1919), oil on canvas, 112 x 144 cm. Dinant: City collection, inv. 203.
  (1919), 142 x 179 cm. Private collection.
  (1924), oil on canvas, 500 x 800 cm. Brussels: Palais de la Justice.
  (1928), oil on canvas, 205 x 135 cm. Private collection.
  (1929), oil on canvas, 180 x 153 cm. Taiwan: Chi Mei Museum.
  (1929), oil on canvas, 205.5 x 93.5 cm. Private collection.
  (1930). Private collection
  (1931), oil on canvas, 110 x 140 cm. Tournai: Musée des Beaux-arts.
  (1931), oil on canvas, 135 x 195 cm. Private collection.
  (1931), oil on canvas, 450 x 300 cm. Private collection
  (1932), oil on canvas, 187 x 103 cm. Private collection.
  (1932), oil on canvas, 159 x 53.5. Private collection.
  (1933), triptych, oil on canvas, 133 x 298 cm. Private collection. 
  (1933), oil on canvas, 200 x 215 cm. Private collection.
  (1934), oil on canvas, 210 x 280 cm. Private collection.
  (1936), oil on canvas, 180 x 250 cm. Private collection.
  (1937), oil on canvas, 240 x 146 cm. Brussels: Conservatoire Royale.
  (1937), oil on canvas, 168 x 127. Private collection.
  (1938), oil on canvas, 112 x 56 cm. Private collection.
  (1938), oil on canvas, 114 x 95 cm. Mons: Musée de Beaux-arts de Belgique, inv. 285.
  (1940), oil on canvas, 298 x 231.1 cm. Antwerp: Royal museum of Fine Art, inv. 2607.
  (1942), oil on canvas, 150 x 330 cm. Private collection.
  (1947), oil on canvas, 100 x 120 cm, private collection

Published works

Books

 (n.d.).
 (n.d.)
 (Bruges: Daveluy Frères, 1895).
. Préface d’Edouard Schuré (Bruxelles: Georges Balat, 1900).
 (Bruxelles: H. Lamertin, (1905).
 (Brussels: "En Art", 1905).
. Conférence Faite à la Branche Centrale Belge de la Société Théosophique (Brussels: c.1905).
 (Paris : Editions Théosophiques, 1913).
, Ville de Bruxelles:Académie Royale des Beaux-Arts et Ecole des Arts Décoratifs (Brussels: E Guyot, 1923).
 (Bruxelles: Les Presses Tilbury, 1925).
, Ledeberg-Gand, Imprimerie Jules de Vreese, 1926 (Extrait du Bulletin Des Commissions Royales d’Art & d’Archéologie LXV e Année, 1926).
 (Brussels: Office de Publicité, 1928).
 (Brussels: Lamertin, 1935).

Poetry anthologies
 (Brussels: 1892).
 (Brussels: H Lamertin, 1897).
 (Brussels: Oscar Lamberty, 1922).
 (Brussels: à l’enseigne de l’oiseau bleu, 1927).

Recent exhibitions
2015. Stone Bell House, City Art Gallery, Prague. Exhibition drawing on works exhibited in Namur in 2014.
2014. Small, but important, exhibition of representative works by Delville.

Popular culture
Swedish thrash metal band Hexenhaus used the painting  for the cover of their album A Tribute to Insanity (1988), while American death metal group Morbid Angel also used it for the cover of their second album, Blessed Are the Sick (1991).
The painting is also quoted and described in Alan Moore's comic Providence (Avatar Press) (issue three of twelve).

Sources
 Brendan Cole, Jean Delville, Art between Nature and the Absolute, Newcastle: Cambridge Scholars Publishing, 2015.
 Brendan Cole, 'Jean Delville and the Belgian Avant-Garde : Anti-Materialist Polemics for 'un art annonciateur des spiritualités futures', in Rosina Neginsky (ed.), Symbolism. Its Origins and Its Consequences, Newcastle: Cambridge Scholars Publishing, 2010, pp. 129–146.
 Miriam Delville, 'Jean Delville, mon grand-père' in Laoureux, et al. Jean Delville, Maître de l'idéal, Paris: Somogy éditions d'art, 2014, pp. 14–36.
 Olivier Delville, Jean Delville, peintre, 1867–1953, Brussels: Laconti, 1984.
 Michel Draguet (ed.), Splendeurs de l’Idéal. Rops, Khnopff, Delville et leur temps. Liège: Musée de l’Art wallon, du 17 octobre décembre 1997.
 Donald Flanell Friedman, « L’évocation du Liebestod par Jean Delville », in La Peinture (d)écrite, Textyles, n° 17–18. Bruxelles: Le Cri Édition, 2000, pp. 79–84.
 Denis Laoureux, et al., Jean Delville (1867–1953) Maitre de l'idéal. Paris: Somogy éditions d'art, 2014.
 Francine-Claire Legrand, Le Symbolisme en Belgique Brussels: Laconti, 1971.
 Francine-Claire Legrand, 'Jean Delville peintre Idéaliste', in Olivier Delville, Jean Delville, peintre, 1867–1953, Brussels: Laconti, 1984, pp. 62–94.

References

External links

Works by Delville
 Jean Delville. La Mission de l'Art Delville's work on Idealist aesthetics from Archive.org
 Jean Delville. The New Mission of Art English translation of Delville's La Mission de l'Art from Archive.org
 Jean Delville. Belgian Art in Exile Book showcasing Belgian Artists to raise money for the Belgian War effort during World War I, edited with an introduction by Delville.

Essays relating to Delville 
 Delville's La Mission d'Art detailed analysis of Delville's aesthetic writings.
 Jean Delville and the Belgian Avant Garde Essay on Delville's conflict with the contemporary avant garde.
 The Writings of Jean Delville Essay (in French) on Delville's writings and poetry.
 Jean Delville and the contemporary esoteric tradition Essay (in French) on the influence of esoteric currents in contemporary Belgian culture on Delville's work.
 La Méduse Article on Delville's la Méduse (1893), Chicago Institute of Art.
 L'évocation du 'Liebestod' par Jean Delville article (in French) on aspects of Delville's Tristan et Yseult (1887).
 Lynda Harris Jean Delville: Painting, Spirituality, and the Esoteric Originally printed in the May – June 2002 issue of Quest magazine. Citation: Harris, Lynda. "Jean Delville: Painting, Spirituality, and the Esoteric." Quest 90.3 (MAY – JUNE 2002).
'Theosopedia' Details of Delville's activities in the Theosophical Society in Belgium.

Websites featuring Delville's art
 Jean Delville: Initiate of Spiritual Beauty A blog/website on the work of Delville with detailed reproductions of his work.
Recent research on Delville's art
Boston College information page on Delville
ArtCyclopedia listings for Delville
Musee d'Orsay entry on Delville's School of Plato
Art Renewal Centre entry on Delville
Online catalogue: Jean Delville: Maïtré de L'Idéal Catalogue of the 2015 exhibition in French (well illustrated).

1867 births
1953 deaths
Artists from Leuven
Belgian Symbolist painters
Belgian occultists
Prix de Rome (Belgium) winners
19th-century Belgian painters
19th-century Belgian male artists
20th-century Belgian painters
Académie Royale des Beaux-Arts alumni
Writers from Leuven
20th-century Belgian male artists